Skylstad is a surname. Notable people with the surname include:

Magnus Skylstad (born 1983), Norwegian musician and record producer
Rasmus Skylstad (1893–1972), Norwegian diplomat
William S. Skylstad (born 1934), American Roman Catholic bishop

Norwegian-language surnames